Mount Hayes  is a plateau-type mountain, situated at the base of Cole Peninsula on the east coast of Graham Land, Antarctica. It was charted in 1947 by the Falkland Islands Dependencies Survey (FIDS), who named it for Rev. Gordon Hayes, Antarctic historian and author of Antarctica: A Treatise on the Southern Continent and The Conquest of the South Pole''.

See also 
McClary Ridge, crescent-shaped ridge 5 nautical miles (9 km) south-southeast of Mount Hayes

References 

Hayes, Mount